Arthur Schlesinger may refer to:
Arthur M. Schlesinger Sr. (1888–1965), American historian and professor at Harvard University
Arthur M. Schlesinger Jr. (1917–2007), his son, American historian, social critic and former John F. Kennedy associate